Laura Jane Gerber (born 29 November 1984) is an Australian politician. She represents the seat of Currumbin in the Queensland Legislative Assembly for the Liberal National Party.

Early life 
Prior to her political career, Gerber was a Commonwealth prosecutor. She spent a period at the Redfern Legal Centre.

Politics 
The seat of Currumbin became vacant due to the resignation of Jann Stuckey. Gerber was announced as the Liberal National Party candidate for Currumbin on 28 January 2020 by Leader of the Opposition Deb Frecklington.  Gerber won the seat in the 2020 Currumbin state by-election.

References

1984 births
Living people
Members of the Queensland Legislative Assembly
Women members of the Queensland Legislative Assembly
Liberal National Party of Queensland politicians
21st-century Australian politicians
21st-century Australian women politicians